Troisvierges railway station is a railway station serving Troisvierges, in northern Luxembourg.  It is operated by Chemins de Fer Luxembourgeois, the state-owned railway company.

The station is situated on Line 10, which connects Luxembourg City to the centre and north of the country.  It is the last station on the line in Luxembourg, before it passes into Belgium on its way to Gouvy. From 1889 it was also connected with Belgium via the Vennbahn, and through Belgium to Germany.

Troisvierges station was the disembarkment point of German soldiers on 1 August 1914, at the outset of the First World War.  This action was the first encroachment upon Luxembourg's sovereignty during the conflict, during which Germany occupied Luxembourg for over four years.

Gallery

References

External links
 Official CFL page on Troisvierges station
 Rail.lu page on Troisvierges station
 The German Occupation of Luxembourg (as documented in the original German and French-language dispatches)

Railway station
Railway stations in Luxembourg
Railway stations on CFL Line 10